Team Menard was an auto racing team that competed in the Indianapolis 500, CART, Indy Racing League, NASCAR Cup Series, and NASCAR Craftsman Truck Series. The team was owned by Menards founder, John Menard Jr.. Founded in 1980 to compete in CART, from 1991 to 1996 they modified their own Buick V6 engines for racing. This combination won pole for the 500 with Scott Brayton in 1995 and 1996; Tony Stewart used this combination for the first part of his 1996-1997 IRL Championship. With more stringent regulations, the team continued to shine winning the 1999 championship with Greg Ray. However, with the influx of former CART teams to the IRL in the early 2000s, Team Menard struggled to compete for wins and the team merged in 2004 with Panther Racing, although their car continued to carry Menard's colors and be driven first by Mark Taylor, who was then replaced by Townsend Bell. In 2005, Menard's was an associate sponsor for another team and the former Menard No. 2 car driven by Tomáš Enge carried no identification to its Menard lineage. For 2006, the No. 2 car was dropped by Panther and all vestiges of the once dominant Team Menard lineage disappeared until the spring of 2008 when Menards became a primary sponsor on the No. 20 Vision Racing Dallara driven by Ed Carpenter in the IndyCar Series.

The Team Menard name has also been used to refer to their sponsoring of various drivers throughout motorsports, including Paul Menard, Ryan Blaney, Austin Cindric, Brandon Jones and Matt Crafton in NASCAR, Simon Pagenaud in IndyCar and Frank Kimmel in ARCA, while TeamMenard.com was a portal to information on these drivers and their sponsor. However, Team Menard is not the name of any of their race teams and none of those cars are owned by John Menard. The URL currently redirects to the Menards home page.

Menard also had a NASCAR team running the No. 13 car. Robby Gordon ran 17 races in 2000, with P.J. Jones running an additional race.

Drivers

CART (1980-1995)
 Herm Johnson (1980–1986)
 Jim Crawford (1990)
 Gary Bettenhausen (1990–1993)
 Kevin Cogan (1991)
 Tom Sneva (1991–1992)
 Al Unser (1992)
 Nelson Piquet (1993)
 Eddie Cheever (1993, 1994)
 Geoff Brabham (1993–1994)
 Scott Brayton (1994–1995)
 Buddy Lazier (1995)
 Arie Luyendyk (1995)

IRL/IndyCar Series (1996-2003)
 Scott Brayton (1996)
 Eddie Cheever (1996)
 Danny Ongais (1996)
 Mark Dismore (1996–1997, 2002)
 Tony Stewart (1996–1998)
 Robbie Buhl (1997–1998)
 Robby Gordon (1999–2000, 2002)
 Greg Ray (1999–2001)
 Jaques Lazier (2001–2003)
 Raul Boesel (2002)
 Vítor Meira (2002–2003)
 P. J. Jones (2002)
 Richie Hearn (2003)

NASCAR Cup Series
 Robby Gordon (2000)
 P.J. Jones (2000)

NASCAR Craftsman Truck Series (2000-2001)
 Bryan Reffner (2000-2001)
 David Starr (2001)

Complete racing results

PPG CART Indycar World Series results
(key)

IRL IndyCar Series results
(key) (Results in bold indicate pole position; results in italics indicate fastest lap)

  The 1999 VisionAire 500K at Charlotte was cancelled after 79 laps due to spectator fatalities.

External links

IndyCar Series teams
American auto racing teams